Deerfoot City  is an outdoor shopping centre located in northeast Calgary, Alberta, Canada. It opened in 1981 as Deerfoot Outlet Mall, just east of Deerfoot Trail (Highway 2) on 64th Avenue NE. The 1.1 million square foot shopping centre, owned by Shape Properties, sits on an 80-acre site.

History
Upon its opening, the mall's anchor tenants were Woolco, Canada Safeway, and The Bay. The original mall featured 80 retailers, including a mixture of chain and independent businesses, a bowling alley, and a food court. During the mall's early history, all three anchors closed or were rebranded: Woolco became Walmart; Safeway closed; and The Bay location was taken over by Sears Canada. Eventually, the former Safeway location was divided up into several smaller retailers, including Winners.

By the 1990s, Deerfoot Mall was considered an "outlet mall," billing itself as "Western Canada's only enclosed outlet mall."

In the 2000s, both Walmart and Sears closed their locations within the mall, with Walmart opening a standalone store to the immediate southeast of the building, and Sears closing its store altogether. This left Winners and the bowling alley as the mall's last remaining anchors, though both the former Walmart and Sears locations were redeveloped for other retailers.

A plan announced in September 2013 called for converting the enclosed mall into an open-air regional centre, and add over 500,000 additional square feet of retail space. It was subsequently renamed Deerfoot City.

As of 2019, major anchors include The Rec Room, Wal-Mart, Canadian Tire, Cabela's, Goodlife Fitness, Dollarama and Winners. The original mall structure has been split into three sections that are separated by roadways, with larger "big box" retailers such as Cabela's taking up locations along the property's periphery.

See also
 List of shopping malls in Canada

References

Shopping malls in Calgary
Shopping malls established in 1981
1981 establishments in Alberta